History and Sociology of South Asia is a biannual peer-reviewed academic journal covering research on the social, economic, and political fabric of South Asian societies. It is published by SAGE Publishing in association with the Centre for Jawaharlal Nehru Studies (Jamia Millia Islamia) and the editor-in-chief is Velayutham Saravanan.

Abstracting and indexing
The journal is abstracted and indexed in Scopus and in EBSCO and ProQuest databases

References

External links
 

Publications established in 2007
Biannual journals
Asian history journals
Social history journals
Sociology journals
SAGE Publishing academic journals
Jamia Millia Islamia